Stone Quarry Mills is a small unincorporated community in Spiceland Township, Henry County, Indiana, United States.

Geography 
Stone Quarry Mills is located at  (39.8333, -85.4667).

References

External links 
 Stone Quarry Mills (inhabited place)

Unincorporated communities in Indiana
Unincorporated communities in Henry County, Indiana